Jacob Henry (born 31 August 2000) is a Scottish rugby union player for Edinburgh in the United Rugby Championship. Henry's primary position is wing or fullback.

Rugby Union career

Professional career

Henry was named in the Edinburgh academy squad for the 2021–22 season. He is yet to debut for Edinburgh, but has represented Scotland Sevens at one tournament.

External links
itsrugby Profile

References

2000 births
Living people
Edinburgh Rugby players
Rugby union wings
Rugby union fullbacks
Scottish rugby union players
Rugby sevens players at the 2022 Commonwealth Games